Guillermo Christian Centurión Elizalde (born 23 July 2001) is a Uruguayan professional footballer who plays as a goalkeeper.

Club career
Centurión is a youth academy graduate of Nacional. He made his professional debut on 15 January 2021 in Torneo Intermedio final against Montevideo Wanderers.

In August 2021, Centurión joined Villa Española on a short-term loan deal until the end of the year.

International career
Centurión is a Uruguay youth international.

Career statistics

Honours
Nacional
Uruguayan Primera División: 2020
Supercopa Uruguaya: 2021

References

External links
 

2001 births
Living people
Association football goalkeepers
Uruguayan footballers
Uruguayan Primera División players
Club Nacional de Football players
Villa Española players